Atalay Babacan (born 28 June 2000) is a Turkish professional footballer who plays as a midfielder for the Turkish club Sarıyer in the TFF Second League on loan from Galatasaray.

Club career

Galatasaray
In 2015, he transferred to Galatasaray infrastructure. Playing for Galatasaray U-16, U-17 and U-21 teams, Babacan signed a 3-year official contract with Galatasaray on 8 October 2018. He played his first official game against Galatasaray on 5 December 2018, in the 5th round match of the Turkish Cup, at Keçiörengücü away. The young star, who stayed on the field for 65 minutes, scored the first goal of his team in the match that Galatasaray won 2–1.

Ümraniyespor (loan)
On 26 January 2022, Galatasaray announced that the 21-year-old football player was loaned to Ümraniyespor, one of the TFF First League teams, until the end of the season.

Sarıyer (loan)
On 8 September 2022, he signed a 1-year loan contract with TFF Second League team Sarıyer.

References

External links
 

2000 births
Sportspeople from Denizli
Living people
Turkish footballers
Turkey youth international footballers
Association football midfielders
Galatasaray S.K. footballers
Adanaspor footballers
Ümraniyespor footballers
Sarıyer S.K. footballers
Süper Lig players
TFF First League players
TFF Second League players